Ballew v. Georgia, 435 U.S. 223 (1978), was a case heard by the United States Supreme Court that held that a Georgia state statute authorizing criminal conviction upon the unanimous vote of a jury of five was unconstitutional.  The constitutional minimum size for a jury hearing petty criminal offenses was held to be six.

See also
List of United States Supreme Court cases, volume 435

References

External links
 

United States Sixth Amendment jury case law
United States Supreme Court cases
1978 in United States case law
Legal history of Georgia (U.S. state)
United States Supreme Court cases of the Burger Court